Sollu Thambi Sollu is a 1959 Indian Tamil-language romantic comedy film produced and directed by T. V. Sundaram. It is an adaptation of the William Shakespeare play As You Like It. The film stars Prem Nazir and Rajasulochana. It was released on 27 March 1959, and did not succeed commercially.

Plot 
Chinnathambi, the only son of a wealthy estate owner Sundaram Pillai, falls in love with Kalyani, the daughter of a poor clerk, but their romance faces obstacles.

Cast 
 Prem Nazir as Chinnathambi
 Rajasulochana as Kalyani
 S. S. Rajendran
 M. N. Nambiar
 T. S. Muthaiah
 K. Sarangapani
 Friend Ramasamy
 G. Sakunthala
 T. A. Mathuram
 S. D. Subbulakshmi
 K. S. Angamuthu

Production 
Sollu Thambi Sollu is an adaptation of the William Shakespeare play As You Like It, and was in development as early as July 1958. It was directed by T. V. Sundaram, who also produced the film under his own company T. V. S. Productions. The dialogues were written by Vindhan.

Soundtrack 
The soundtrack was composed by K. V. Mahadevan, and the lyrics were written by A. Maruthakasi and T. V. Kalyani.

Release 
Sollu Thambi Sollu was released on 27 March 1959, and did not succeed commercially.

References

Bibliography

External links 
 

1950s Tamil-language films
1959 films
1959 romantic comedy films
Films based on As You Like It
Films scored by K. V. Mahadevan
Indian films based on plays
Indian romantic comedy films